The Palmachim Airbase is an Israeli military facility and spaceport located near the cities of Rishon LeZion and Yavne on the Mediterranean coast. It is named after nearby Kibbutz Palmachim.

The base is home to several IAF helicopter and UAV squadrons, and serves as a rocket launch site for the Arrow missile.

Palmachim is also used to launch the Shavit space launch vehicle into retrograde orbit by launching over the Mediterranean, acting as Israel's primary spaceport. This ensures that rocket debris falls into water, and that the rocket does not fire over regional neighboring countries near Israel that could use the technology. Palmachim is also used to test ballistic missiles, such as the Jericho.

Recent launches include:
 11 June 2007 - Ofeq-7 satellite 
 17 January 2008 - version of the Jericho III missile
 22 June 2010 - Ofeq-9 satellite 
 2 November 2011 - version of the Jericho III missile
 9 April 2014 - Ofeq-10 satellite 
 13 September 2016 - Ofeq-11 satellite 
 29 May 2017 - rocket propulsion system test launch 
 6 July 2020 - Ofeq-16 reconnaissance satellite

In July 2007, it was agreed that once Sde Dov Airport in Tel Aviv was closed, its military terminal would be transferred to Palmachim.
The terminal was transferred when Sde Dov Airport ceased operations in July 2019.

Units 
The current units at Palmachim include:
7th Special Air Forces Wing
Unit 669
Unit 5101
Unit 5700 (In Hebrew) 
 123 Squadron – operating UH-60 Black Hawk
 124th Squadron – operating Sikorsky S-70, Sikorsky UH-60 Black Hawk
 151st Squadron – Missile Testing Squadron
 161th Squadron – operating Elbit Hermes 450 UAVs
 166th Squadron – operating Elbit Hermes 900 UAVs
 200th Squadron – operating IAI Heron UAVs

Orbital launch history 

On 17 January 2008, Israel test fired a multi-stage ballistic missile believed to be of the Jericho III type, reportedly capable of carrying "conventional or non conventional warheads". On 2 November 2011, Israel successfully test fired a missile believed to be an upgraded version of the Jericho III; the long trail of smoke was seen throughout central Israel.

References

External links 

 Palmachim Air Force Base (Israel), Jane's Information Group
 Palmachim Airbase, Airports-Worldwide.com
 Palmachim Airbase, Globalsecurity.org

Buildings and structures completed in the 1960s
Space program of Israel
Israeli Air Force bases
Spaceports
Rocket launch sites